Jebel Ghawil is a village and a mountain in Al Buraimi Governorate, in northwestern Oman. The village lies northwest of Abud.

Geology
Geologically Jebel Ghawil constitutes a formation with Jebel Suweini. It consists of Triassic limestone, which is said to be "underlain by a thick sequence of pillow lavas, which are partly imbricated with cherts". There are three sills intruded into basaltic lavas and tuffs dated to the late Triassic and its sills reportedly give K-Ar ages on separated biotites of 93-4 ±4Ma.

References

Populated places in Oman
Ghawil